Wheelchair fencing at the 1988 Summer Paralympics consisted of fourteen events, nine for men and five for women.

Medal summary

Men's events

Women's events

References 

 

1988 Summer Paralympics events
1988
Paralympics
International fencing competitions hosted by South Korea